The Cobb County School District (CCSD) is the county government agency which operates public schools in Cobb County, Georgia, United States.  The school district includes all of Cobb County except for the Marietta City Schools, though a number of schools in unincorporated parts of the county have Marietta addresses.  It is the second-largest school system in Georgia (behind only Gwinnett County Public Schools) and among the largest in the United States. The district is the county's largest employer and one of the largest in the US (at least in school systems). All Cobb County schools are accredited by the Southern Association of Colleges and Schools (SACS), and the district is among the first to have earned district-wide accreditation. The current superintendent of the school district is Chris Ragsdale.

Board of Education
As a body created under provisions of the Georgia's constitution, the Cobb County Board of Education has full authority to control and manage the public schools within the county, excluding any independent school system now in existence within the county.  This means that like other school systems in the state, it is directly under the Georgia Department of Education and not subject to city or county government control.  This also means that it has separate funding through its own property tax (except on senior citizens) outside of Marietta city limits, and 1% county-wide sales tax which it splits with Marietta City Schools based on which jurisdiction it was collected in.

As of December 2022, the elected board members of the Cobb County Board of Education of the Cobb County School District are:

 Randy Scamihorn (Post 1) 
 Jaha Howard (Post 2)
 Leroy Tre' Hutchins (Post 3)
 David Chastain (Post 4, Board Chair)
 David Banks (Post 5, Board Vice-Chair)
 Charisse Davis (Post 6)
 Brad Wheeler (Post 7)

The board manages a fiscal year 2022 general-fund operating budget of $1.17 billion.

Schools

Elementary schools
 Acworth Intermediate School
 Addison Elementary School
 Argyle Elementary School
 Austell Elementary School
 Baker Elementary School
 Bells Ferry Elementary School
 Belmont Hills Elementary School
 Big Shanty Elementary School
 Birney Elementary School
 Blackwell Elementary School
 Brumby Elementary School
 Bryant Elementary School
 Bullard Elementary School
 Chalker Elementary School
 Cheatham Hill Elementary School
 City View Elementary School
 Clarkdale Elementary School
 Clay-Harmony Leland Elementary School
 Compton Elementary School
 Davis Elementary School
 Dowell Elementary School
 Due West Elementary School
 East Side Elementary School
 Eastvalley Elementary School
 Fair Oaks Elementary School
 Ford Elementary School
 Frey Elementary School
 Garrison Mill Elementary School
 Green Acres Elementary School
 Hayes Elementary School
 Hendricks Elementary School
 Hollydale Elementary School
 Keheley Elementary School
 Kemp Elementary School
 Kennesaw Elementary School
 Kincaid Elementary School
 King Springs Elementary School
 LaBelle Elementary School
 Lewis Elementary School
 Mableton Elementary School
 McCall Primary School
 Milford Elementary School
 Mount Bethel Elementary School
 Mountain View Elementary School
 Murdock Elementary School
 Nicholson Elementary School
 Nickajack Elementary School
 Norton Park Elementary School
 Pickett's Mill Elementary School
 Pitner Elementary School
 Powder Springs Elementary School
 Powers Ferry Elementary School
 Riverside Elementary School
 Rocky Mount Elementary School
 Russell Elementary School
 Sanders Elementary School
 Sedalia Park Elementary School
 Shallowford Falls Elementary School
 Smyrna Elementary School
 Sope Creek Elementary School
 Still Elementary School
 Teasley Elementary School
 Timber Ridge Elementary School
 Tritt Elementary School
 Varner Elementary School
 Vaughan Elementary School

Middle schools
 Awtrey Middle School
 Barber Middle School
 Campbell Middle School
 Cooper Middle School
 Daniell Middle School
 Dickerson Middle School
 Dodgen Middle School
 Durham Middle School
 East Cobb Middle School
 Floyd Middle School
 Garrett Middle School
 Griffin Middle School
 Hightower Trail Middle School
 Lindley 6 Grade Academy
 Georgia Japanese School
 Lindley Middle School
 Lost Mountain Middle School
 Lovinggood Middle School
 Mabry Middle School
 McCleskey Middle School
 McClure Middle School
 Palmer Middle School
 Pearson Middle School
 Pine Mountain Middle School
 Simpson Middle School
 Smitha Middle School
 Tapp Middle School

High schools

The district administers these 17 government high schools:
 Allatoona High School
 Campbell High School
 Campbell High School International Baccalaureate Program
 Harrison High School
 Hillgrove High School
 Kell High School
 Chick Fil’A Leadership Academy
 Kennesaw Mountain High School
 Kennesaw Mountain High School Academy of Mathematics, Science, and Technology
 Transition Academy 
 Lassiter High School
 McEachern High School
 North Cobb High School
 North Cobb School for International Studies  
 North Cobb High School Freshman Academy 
 Osborne High School
 Transition Academy 
 3DE School
 Cobb Innovation and Technology Academy 
 Pebblebrook High School
 STEAM Academy 
 Pebblebrook High School Center for Excellence in the Performing Arts
 Pope High School
 Transition Academy 
 South Cobb High School
 South Cobb High School Academy of Research and Medical Sciences
 Sprayberry High School
 Science, Technology, Engineering & Math Academy 
 Transition Academy 
 International Spanish Academy 
 Walton High School
 International Spanish Academy 
 STEM Leadership Academy
 Wheeler High School
 Wheeler HS Center for Advanced Studies in Science, Mathematics, & Technology

Special needs schools and other programs
 Adult Education Center
 Paulding
 Cobb
 Deveraux Ackerman Academy
 Learning Everywhere 
 Elementary Virtual Program
 Cobb Virtual Academy
 Cobb Horizon High School 
 Cobb Online Learning Academy at CHHS
GNETS
 HAVEN Program
 HAVEN Academy at Sky View
 Douglas HAVEN
 Cobb HAVEN
 HAVEN
 HAVEN Academy 
 Marietta City HAVEN
Pre-K
Sports News
Food and Nutrition Services
Preschool
ESOL
Cobb Mentoring Matters
 Homeless Education Program 
 Intensive English Program
 International Welcome Center
 South Cobb Early Learning Center
 Magnet Programs
 Ombudsman
 Title 1

Charter schools
 Walton High School

Former school and program list

 E-High School
 West Cobb High School
 Headstart
 Fitzhugh Lee Elementary
 Acworth High School
 Acworth Elementary School 
 Brown Elementary School 
 Riverside Intermediate School
 Teasley Intermediate School
 Olive Springs Consolidated School
 Olive Springs Community School 
 International Welcome Center 2
 Hawthorne HAVEN School
 Fitzhugh Lee HAVEN School
 Success For All Students
 Oakwood Open Campus High School
 Central Alternative 
 Transitional Learning Center
 Oakwood Digital Academy
 Performance Learning Center
 Cobb Night School

Former schools

The original Clarkdale Elementary School was a Cobb County school that opened in the 1960s and closed on September 21, 2009, due to the massive flooding in Georgia that day, which submerged the school to the ceiling in the waters of nearby Noses Creek. Despite being built outside the 100-year flood plain, water rose ankle-deep on the grounds as the children were being evacuated.

The school housed about 450 students. For three school years, these students attended Compton Elementary (K-2) and Austell Intermediate (3-5). The new Clarkdale Elementary opened in mid-August 2012 near Cooper Middle School (although the Federal Emergency Management Agency declared the original site acceptable), while the previous building awaited demolition, a delay which the local neighborhood complained about.

State funding (a bond for 20% of the cost of replacement) was vetoed by Governor Sonny Perdue on procedural grounds in early June 2010. Most of the remainder will be covered by insurance and leftover SPLOST funds.

At least one other school has been demolished. The original Blackwell Elementary School in the Blackwells community was built in the 1920s on Canton Road (old Georgia 5), as the county's first consolidated school. The historic schoolhouse, and all of its later additions, were destroyed in summer 1997 and closed for a year while a new replacement was built on the same site, in an institutional style much like the plain architecture of an office park rather than a historic school.

The original Mountain View Elementary was rebuilt farther down Sandy Plains Road; the original was demolished in 2018 for a new shopping center. Also located in a busy business district, Brumby Elementary on Powers Ferry Road was set to be replaced by a mixed-use development in 2020 with a Kroger superstore by 2022. Both Brumby and East Cobb Middle School opened new schools next to each other on Terrell Mill Road in August 2018, although local residents objected to the expected traffic and noise. The old East Cobb Middle School, located directly across Holt Road from Wheeler HS, will be home to a relocated Eastvalley Elementary School.

Controversies

Power to Learn laptop initiative
In 2005, the district implemented a technology initiative called Power to Learn, which supplies individual laptop computers to students for use in the classroom. The initiative was to be initially funded by a portion of the special-purpose local-option sales tax (SPLOST) funds approved by Cobb voters in the 2003 referendum and earmarked for technology improvements. The first of three proposed phases of the initiative was approved by the Board of Education in April 2005, authorizing purchase of Apple laptops for all teachers, upgrades of middle school business labs, and the establishment of four high school pilot sites to test and evaluate individual student laptop use.

Former county commissioner Joseph "Butch" Thompson filed a lawsuit against the Board of Education on May 31, 2005. The lawsuit charged that Cobb voters did not specifically authorize the program in the 2003 SPLOST vote. On July 29, 2005, Superior Court Judge S. Lark Ingram mandated the Board of Education to use technology funds as specified in SPLOST II and ordered a permanent injunction to halt the Power to Learn initiative. The Atlanta Journal-Constitution quoted Ingram, "The ruling had nothing to do with the merits of the program. But fair notice of such use was not given to the public when the referendum for [the sales tax] was held." Board chair Kathleen Johnstone announced on August 1 that the laptop program "was no longer an option." The board voted on August 25, 2005, to appeal the ruling, which was thrown out by the Georgia Supreme Court.

Superintendent Redden's resignation
The Board of Education hired New York-based auditing firm Kessler International in July 2005 to investigate the bidding process for the initiative, amid allegations that the bidding process which selected Apple Computer as supplier for the initiative had violated state law. The board received the Kessler report on August 14, 2005. The report indicated flaws in the selection process that were not in line with state procurement policies. Superintendent Gen. Joseph Redden offered a page-by-page rebuttal of the audit report to the board on August 17, 2005. Redden announced his resignation on August 24, 2005.

Grand jury investigation
Upon the request of the Board of Education, Cobb District Attorney Pat Head was granted an order on October 6, 2005, to empanel a special grand jury to investigate the bidding process. On April 19, 2007, the 25-member grand jury released its report and suggested no criminal charges be filed. The report was critical of the school district's procurement processes, and suggested that the district provide greater definition and clarity to its purchasing procedures. The release of the grand jury report concluded the laptop initiative saga. The school district began refreshing outdated computer systems throughout the county in early 2007, precisely as outlined in SPLOST II.

Selman v. Cobb County School District

In 2002, Cobb County School District voted to put stickers on textbooks with a message including the admonition cautioning students that "evolution is only a theory." Plaintiffs brought suit on separation of church and state grounds, with the initial trial finding for the plaintiffs. Cobb County School District appealed and the verdict was overturned and remanded for a new trial, at which time plaintiffs and Cobb County School District reached an out-of-court settlement, with the district agreeing to remove the stickers.

Teacher's sexual contact with student
A Cobb County teacher was discovered to have had sex with a 17-year-old student. When brought to trial, the teacher pleaded that the student had consented. This defense was allowed by the Superior Court judge and upheld by the Georgia Supreme Court in 2009. This led the Georgia legislature to pass a statute in 2010 making it a crime for a teacher to have sexual relations with a student.

References

External links
 
 Report of the Southern Association on Colleges and Schools Accreditation (2011 archive)

School districts in Georgia (U.S. state)